is a Japanese footballer currently playing as a forward for Nagano Parceiro on loan from Mito HollyHock.

Career statistics

Club
Updated to the end 2022 season.

Notes

References

External links

1996 births
Living people
Japanese footballers
Association football forwards
Tokyo International University alumni
J2 League players
J3 League players
Tokyo 23 FC players
YSCC Yokohama players
Kataller Toyama players
Mito HollyHock players
AC Nagano Parceiro players